Careywood is an unincorporated community in Bonner County, Idaho, United States. Careywood has a post office with ZIP code 83809.

History
Originally known as Severance, the town was renamed Careywood after a man named Carey from Spokane who bought land in the area. At the time, Careywood was involved in the logging industry. Caryewood's population was 25 in 1960.

Climate
This region experiences warm (but not hot) and dry summers, with no average monthly temperatures above 71.6 °F.  According to the Köppen Climate Classification system, Careywood has a warm-summer Mediterranean climate, abbreviated "Csb" on climate maps.

References

Unincorporated communities in Bonner County, Idaho
Unincorporated communities in Idaho